Leptosema is a genus of flowering plants from the legume family Fabaceae. According to the Australian Plant Census, species of Leptosema occur in the Northern Territory, Western Australia, South Australia and Queensland.

Species
Leptosema comprises the following species:
 Leptosema aculeatum Crisp
 Leptosema anomalum (Ewart & Morrison) Crisp
 Leptosema bossiaeoides Benth.
 Leptosema chambersii F.Muell.
 Leptosema daviesioides (Turcz.) Benth.

 Leptosema uniflorum (Benth.) Crisp

Species names with uncertain taxonomic status
The status of the following species is unresolved:
 Leptosema aphyllum (Hook.) Crisp
 Leptosema cervicorne Crisp
 Leptosema chapmanii Crisp
 Leptosema macrocarpum (Benth.) Crisp
 Leptosema oxylobioides F.Muell.
 Leptosema tomentosum (Benth.) Crisp
 Leptosema villosum Crisp

References

Mirbelioids
Fabales of Australia
Rosids of Western Australia
Fabaceae genera